Pernette Du Guillet (c.1520 – July 7, 1545) was a female French poet of the Renaissance.

She was born into a noble family in Lyon, and married in 1537 or 1538 a man with the last name Du Guillet. In the spring of 1536, she met the poet Maurice Scève (she was 16; he was 35), and she would serve as Scève's poetic muse, inspiring his Délie. From this work has come the reputation of her beauty and significant culture. She lived in Lyon, which was culturally blooming during her lifetime. After her death, her poetry was published in Rymes de Gentille et Vertueuse Dame, Pernette du Guillet.

See also

Louise Labé

Notes

External links
 Poems by Pernette Du Guillet (in French)
 Website on Pernette Du Guillet (in French)

16th-century French women writers
16th-century French writers
1520s births
1545 deaths
French women poets